Denny Borsboom (born November 9, 1973) is a Dutch psychologist and psychometrician. He has been a professor of psychology at the University of Amsterdam since 2013. His work has included applying network theory to the study of mental disorders and their symptoms. In 2018 he presented the Paul B. Baltes Lecture at the Berlin-Brandenburg Academy of Sciences and Humanities.

Books
Measuring the Mind (Cambridge University Press, 2005).

References

External links

Faculty page

1973 births
Living people
Dutch psychologists
Psychometricians
Academic staff of the University of Amsterdam
University of Amsterdam alumni
People in health professions from The Hague
Quantitative psychologists